Tapper is a surname. Notable people with the surname include:

 Ben Tapper, American social media influencer and chiropractor
Bertha Tapper (1859-1915), composer
 Brad Tapper (born 1978), Canadian ice hockey player
 Bruce Elliot Tapper (born ?), American anthropologist
 Charles Tapper (born 1993), American football player
 Jake Tapper (born 1969), American journalist
 Kain Tapper (1930–2004), Finnish sculptor
 Michael Tapper (born ?), American drummer
 Richard Tapper (swimmer) (born 1968), New Zealand freestyle swimmer
 Richard Tapper (21st century), English anthropologist
 Staffan Tapper (born 1948), Swedish footballer
 Thomas Tapper (1864-1958), author and composer
 Walter Tapper (1861–1935), British architect
 Zoe Tapper (born 1981), English actress